De Onde Eu Te Vejo ("From Where I See You") is a 2016 Brazilian comedy film, directed by Luiz Villaça, starring Denise Fraga, Domingos Montagner, Manoela Aliperti, Juca de Oliveira and Laura Cardoso. The screenplay was written by Leonardo Moreira e Rafael Gomes. With a Bossa Nova Films and Warner Bros. production, it was released by the latter on April 7, 2016.

Plot
The film tells the story of a couple settling for divorce after 20 years of marriage and trying to adapt to a new reality when the ex-husband starts dwelling across the street from the old family home.

References 

Warner Bros. films
2016 films
2016 comedy films
2010s Portuguese-language films
Brazilian comedy films